The University of Allahabad is a collegiate central university located in Allahabad, Uttar Pradesh, India. It was established on 23 September 1887 by an act of Parliament and is recognised as an Institute of National Importance (INI). It is one of the oldest modern universities in India. Its origins lie in the Muir Central College, named after Lt. Governor of North-Western Provinces Sir William Muir in 1876, who suggested the idea of a Central University at Allahabad, which later evolved to the present university. It is known as the "Oxford of the East". Its Central University status was re-established through the University of Allahabad Act 2005 by the Parliament of India.

History

The foundation stone of the Muir Central College was laid by Governor-General of India, Lord Northbrook on 9 December 1873. The college was named after Sir William Muir, Lt. Governor of United Province, who was the key person in its foundation. The building was designed by William Emerson, who also designed Victoria Memorial in Kolkata and Crawford Market in Mumbai in a combination of Indo-Saracenic, Egyptian and Gothic styles.

Initially, it functioned under the University of Calcutta and later, on 23 September 1887, the University of Allahabad was established, making it the fifth university established in colonial India after Calcutta university, Bombay university, Madras university, and Lahore's Punjab university.

It began as an affiliating and examining body for graduate and postgraduate degrees with a classical orientation and the responsibility for secondary education as well. Between 1891 and 1922, Government Science College, Jabalpur, the oldest science college of India was affiliated to the university. By 1904 the university established its own teaching departments and instituted doctoral research programs. The University Senate hall was opened by the lieutenant-governor, Sir John Hewett, in 1912.

In 1921, with the announcement of the Allahabad University Act of 1921, the Muir Central College merged with the university, which was reorganized as a unitary teaching and residential university. Over the next few years its affiliated colleges were transferred to Agra University and the task of conducting secondary-level examinations was relocated.

In 1951, the university (while maintaining its fundamental unitary character) recognized certain local institutions as associated colleges authorized to teach undergraduate courses under the Faculty of Arts, Commerce, Science, and Law.

In view of these achievements, as well as its position among the universities of Uttar Pradesh, the state government accorded it formal recognition in July 1992 as a 'premier institution' (Vishesh Agrani Sanstha). During the university's centenary celebrations in 1987 there were demands from students, faculty, and employees for the granting of status as a central university.

In 2003 the union cabinet decided to restore the central universality status of the university. This central university status was finally restored in 2005, through The University of Allahabad Act by the Parliament of India, which also declared the university an Institution of National Importance.

It has been accredited by the National Assessment and Accreditation Council.

Campus
The campus is spread around the city of Allahabad across the area of Old Katra and Bank Road. It consists of major five faculties, namely Science, Arts, commerce, law, management faculties with the arts faculty housing the Administrative Block of Chatham Lines. It has numerous residential hostels for students.

Organization and administration

Governance
The president of India is the visitor and the governor of Uttar Pradesh is the chief rector of the university. The chancellor is the ceremonial head of the university while the executive powers rest with the vice-chancellor. The Court, the Executive Council, the Academic Council, the Board of Faculties and the Finance Committee are the administrative authorities of the university.

The University Court is the supreme authority of the university and has the power to review, the broad policies and programs of the university and to suggest measures for the improvement and development of the university; The Executive Council is the highest executive body of the university. The Academic Council is the highest academic body of the university and is responsible for the co-ordination and exercising general supervision over the academic policies of the university. It has the right to advise the Executive Council on all academic matters. The Finance Committee is responsible for recommending financial policies, goals, and budgets.

In November 2020, Professor Sangita Srivastava was appointed as the new regular vice chancellor of Allahabad University. She was the first woman elected to this post at the university.

Colleges
The following colleges are component of Allahabad University:
Allahabad Degree College
Arya Kanya Degree College
Chaudhary Mahadeo Prasad Post Graduate College
Ewing Christian College (Autonomous Minority College)
Govind Ballabh Pant Social Science Institute
Hamidia Girls' Degree College
Ishwar Saran Degree College
Jagat Taran Girls' Degree College
K.P Training College
Rajarshi Tandon Girls' Degree College
S.S. Khanna Girls Degree College
S.P.M. Govt. Degree College

Affiliation
There was much controversy related to the merger of the Motilal Nehru Medical College with the university, which was later resolved. The High Court of Allahabad passed an order directing that the integration of the medical college with the university should be completed by 1 October 2006.

Student life

Academic profile

Rankings

Allahabad University has been accessed and accredited to grade "B++" by NAAC with a score of 2.84 CGPA. The university was ranked 401–450 in Asia by the QS World University Rankings of 2020.

Notable alumni and faculty members

 Chandra Shekhar, former prime minister of India
 Madan Mohan Malaviya, founder of Banaras Hindu University
 Govind Ballabh Pant, former chief minister of Uttar Pradesh
 Shankar Dayal Sharma, former president of India
 Ranganath Misra, former chief justice of India
 Rajendra Kumari Bajpai, former union minister of India, lieutenant governor of Pondicherry 

 Sanjeev Kumar Yadav, law enforcement.

Ram Naresh Shukla,Unopposed President of Allahabad University Student's Union during 1941-42 period of Quit India Movement, State Minister of Law, Freedom Fighter in Uttar Pradesh

References

Further reading
 The Muir Central College, Allahabad: its origin foundation, and completion, by William Henry Wright, published in 1985, Govt. Press, North-Western Provinces and Oudh (Allahabad).
 Materials and Motifs of the Philosophical Traditions of Allahabad University, by Sangam Lal Pandey. Published by Ram Nath Kaul Library of Philosophy, University of Allahabad, 1981.
 Hundred years of Allahabad University, by Moti Lal Bhargava. Published by Ashish Pub. House, 1987. .

External links

 

Central universities in Uttar Pradesh
 
Schools in Colonial India
Educational institutions established in 1887
1887 establishments in British India